The National Orthodox School-Shmaisani (NOS) is a private, non-profit, co-educational day school in Amman, Jordan, affiliated to Greek Orthodox Christianity. NOS recently became a candidate school for the International Baccalaureate Diploma Programme which it plans to start offering for Grades 11 and 12 students starting the academic year 2018/2019.

NOS was founded by – and operates under the umbrella of – the Orthodox Educational Society (OES), a national not-profit, charitable organization which has among its philanthropic aims the establishment and administration of schools and other educational institutions throughout Jordan.

Born out of the Arab Orthodox Movement in 1957, NOS was the first co-educational school in the country. Operating out of a rented building in the Jabal Amman, they began with only 70 students and four teachers in three grades (KG1 - Grade One). In 1965, they moved to their permanent premises in the Shmaisani area of West Amman, and they continued to grow until they celebrated their first graduating class in 1972. Today, the school's population has grown to around 2400 students (from KG1 – Grade 12), with more than 360 staff members.

The school is an accredited member of the Council of International Schools (CIS).

NOS has also been accredited by the Healthy Schools National Accreditation Project, since 2014. The Health Schools project was initiated by The Royal Health Awareness Society in cooperation with the Ministry of Health (MOH) and the Ministry of Education (MOE).

On the academic front, NOS is a Certified Examination Centre for Edexcel Programmes and Cambridge International Programme. In April 2016, NOS became a Candidate School for the International Baccalaureate Programme.

Academic sections

There are five academic stages at NOS:
  Kindergarten (KG1 and KG2) – known as Whabeh Tamari Kindergarten, in a separate but nearby location.
Stages at the NOS-Shmaisani Campus
 ·   Lower Primary Stage (Grades 1-3)
 ·    Upper Primary Stage (Grades 4-5)
 ·    Middle Stage (Grades 6-8)
 ·    High school Stage (Grades 9-12)

See also

Tawjihi
List of private schools in Jordan
Religion in Jordan
IGCSE
List of universities in Jordan
Abdul Hamid Sharaf School
Oxford Schools
King's Academy
Islamic School, Irbid

References

External links 
 Jordan Ministry of Education
 Jordan Ministry of Higher Education and Scientific Research]

Christian schools in Jordan
Private schools in Jordan
International schools in Jordan
Schools in Amman
Eastern Orthodox schools
1957 establishments in Jordan
Educational institutions established in 1957